Judge Earl S. Stone House is a historic home located at Noblesville, Hamilton County, Indiana.  It was built in 1849, and is a two-story, five bay, "L"-shaped, Greek Revival style brick dwelling. It is probably the oldest building in Noblesville.

It was listed on the National Register of Historic Places in 1978.

References

Houses on the National Register of Historic Places in Indiana
Greek Revival houses in Indiana
Houses completed in 1849
Buildings and structures in Hamilton County, Indiana
National Register of Historic Places in Hamilton County, Indiana